Georgia competed at the 2004 Summer Olympics in Athens, Greece, from 13 to 29 August 2004. Georgian National Olympic Committee (GNOC) sent the nation's smallest delegation to the Games since the post-Soviet era. A total of 32 athletes, 26 men and 6 women, competed in 10 different sports.

The Georgian team featured four bronze medalists from the previous games: weightlifter Giorgi Asanidze, and wrestlers Akaki Chachua, Eldar Kurtanidze, and Mukhran Vakhtangadze. Among these medalists, Asanidze managed to beat his opponents and overhaul the host nation's defending champion Pyrros Dimas for the gold in the men's 85 kg class. Other notable athletes included pistol shooter and 1988 Olympic champion Nino Salukvadze, who participated in her fifth games under three different banners (the other two were Soviet Union and the Unified Team) as the oldest and most experienced member of the contingent, and judoka and world champion Zurab Zviadauri, who was appointed by GNOC to be the nation's flag bearer in the opening ceremony.

Georgia left Athens with a total of four medals (two golds and two silver). These medals were officially awarded to Asanidze, Zviadauri, lightweight judoka Nestor Khergiani, and Greco-Roman wrestler Ramaz Nozadze.

Medalists

Archery 

Georgia has qualified two spots in the women's individual archery.

Athletics 

Georgian athletes have so far achieved qualifying standards in the following athletics events (up to a maximum of 3 athletes in each event at the 'A' Standard, and 1 at the 'B' Standard).

Key
 Note–Ranks given for track events are within the athlete's heat only
 Q = Qualified for the next round
 q = Qualified for the next round as a fastest loser or, in field events, by position without achieving the qualifying target
 NR = National record
 N/A = Round not applicable for the event
 Bye = Athlete not required to compete in round

Men
Track & road events

Women
Field events

Boxing 

Georgia sent two boxers to Athens.  They both were defeated in the round of 16, after one victory and one bye in the round of 32.  Their combined record was 1-2.

Gymnastics

Artistic
Men

Trampoline

Judo

Men

Shooting 

Women

Swimming 

Men

Weightlifting

Wrestling 

Key
  - Victory by Fall.
  - Decision by Points - the loser with technical points.
  - Decision by Points - the loser without technical points.

Men's freestyle

Men's Greco-Roman

References

External links
Official Report of the XXVIII Olympiad
Georgian National Olympic Committee 

Nations at the 2004 Summer Olympics
2004
Summer Olympics